Johann Moritz Richter (1620–1667) was a German architect and engraver.

Richter was born in Weimar. In the position of "fürstlich-sächsischer Landbaumeister" (court architect), he designed the oldest extant bridge in Weimar, the Sternbrücke (de), built from 1651 to 1654 crossing the Ilm river. It is part of the Park an der Ilm. He designed the Schloss in Weimar which was destroyed by fire in 1774.

His son continued his work on these buildings after his death. He is buried on the Jacobsfriedhof.

Literature 

 Frank Boblenz: Zum Umfeld des Zeitzer Schloßbaumeisters und Ingenieurs Johann Moritz Richter (1620–1667). In: Die sächsischen Wurzeln des Landes Sachsen-Anhalt und die Rolle der Sekundogenitur Sachsen-Zeitz. Halle 1997, pp. 51–72 (Beiträge zur Regional- und Landeskultur Sachsen-Anhalts. 5).
 Frank Boblenz: „in der ingenieurkunst erzogen undt ihn […] so weit bracht, das er was feines begriffen“. Zur Ausbildung und zum Werk des Weimarer Baumeisters Johann Moritz Richter (1620–1667). In: Weimarbrief. 2/2008. pp. 86–91.

References 

 In: Ulrich Thieme, Felix Becker u. a.: Allgemeines Lexikon der Bildenden Künstler von der Antike bis zur Gegenwart. Band 28, E. A. Seemann, Leipzig 1934, S. 295f.

External links 

 

17th-century German architects
1620 births
1667 deaths
People from Weimar